The 1972 Minnesota Golden Gophers football team represented the University of Minnesota in the 1972 Big Ten Conference football season. In their first year under head coach Cal Stoll, the Golden Gophers compiled a 4–7 record and were outscored by their opponents by a combined total of 304 to 185. 
 
Fullback John King received the team's Most Valuable Player award. King was also named All-Big Ten first team.  Defensive back Tim Alderson was named All-Big Ten second team.  Offensive lineman Doug Kingsriter was named Academic All-Big Ten.

Total attendance for the season was 221,553, which averaged to 36,925. The season high for attendance was against Iowa.

Schedule

Roster

References

Minnesota
Minnesota Golden Gophers football seasons
Minnesota Golden Gophers football